Friedrich "Friedel" Overwien (27 September 1922 – 10 July 2001) was a German gymnast. He competed at the 1952 Summer Olympics in all artistic gymnastics events with the best achievement of 15th place on the pommel horse.

References

1922 births
2001 deaths
German male artistic gymnasts
Gymnasts at the 1952 Summer Olympics
Olympic gymnasts of West Germany